is a Japanese curler from Takarazuka, Hyōgo.

After winning the 2018 Japanese curling championship, Iwai skipped the Japanese national team at the 2018 World Men's Curling Championship. Iwai threw third stones on the team which also consisted of fourth Go Aoki, second Ruyotaro Shukuya and lead Yutaka Aoyama. Iwai led the team to a 3-9 round robin record, an 11th-place finish.

Iwai began the 2018-19 curling season by winning the Hokkaido Bank Curling Classic, his first World Curling Tour event win.

References

External links

Living people
1985 births
Japanese male curlers
Sportspeople from Hyōgo Prefecture